Magda Tania Haroun (born 1952) is the head of the Jewish Community of Egypt. She is the successor of Carmen Weinstein, who had led the community for 20 years until her death in 2013. She is an anti-Zionist, and the daughter of nationalist Egyptian Jewish lawyer and politician Chehata Haroun. She has two daughters and is currently married to a Catholic. Her sister Nadia, deputy leader of the community and one of its youngest remaining members died in 2014.

She is also one of the heads of Drop of Milk, an organization dedicated to preserving Jewish heritage in Egypt.

See also 
 History of the Jews in Egypt

References 

1952 births
Living people
Egyptian Jews

Anti-Zionist Jews